Kevin Maguire (born January 5, 1963) is a Canadian former professional ice hockey forward and referee.  He played in the National Hockey League with the Toronto Maple Leafs, Buffalo Sabres, and Philadelphia Flyers.

In his NHL career, Maguire appeared in 260 games.  He scored 29 goals and added 30 assists while accumulating 782 penalty minutes.  After his playing career, he pursued a career in officiating.  He first worked as an NHL referee in 1999–2000.

Career statistics

NHL Transactions
October 10, 1984: Signed as a free agent by the Toronto Maple Leafs.
October 5, 1987: Claimed by the Buffalo Sabres in the 1987 Waiver Draft.
March 5, 1990: Traded to the Philadelphia Flyers, along with Buffalo's 2nd round choice in the 1990 draft (Mikael Renberg) in exchange for Jay Wells and Philadelphia's 4th round pick in the 1991 draft (Peter Ambroziak).
June 16, 1990: Traded to the Toronto Maple Leafs, along with Philadelphia's 8th round choice in the 1991 draft (Dmitri Mironov) in exchange for Toronto's 3rd round pick in the 1990 draft (Al Kinisky).

Transactions via Hockey Reference

References

External links
 

1963 births
Living people
Buffalo Sabres players
Canadian ice hockey forwards
National Hockey League officials
Newmarket Saints players
Oshawa Generals players
Philadelphia Flyers players
St. Catharines Saints players
St. John's Maple Leafs players
Ice hockey people from Toronto
Toronto Maple Leafs players
Undrafted National Hockey League players